The Festival Grec de Barcelona (or Grec Festival of Barcelona) is an international theatre, dance, music and circus festival. Over the course of its history, this long-standing event has become a major summer attraction in Barcelona, Catalonia, Spain.

The festival takes its name from its main venue: an open-air theatre (the Teatre Grec) built on Mount Montjuïc. The theatre was built in 1929 by the Catalan architect Ramon Reventós in the style of the ancient Greek theatres as part of the 1929 Barcelona International Exposition. By 1976, the theatre had fallen into a semi-abandoned state. The first Grec Festival both salvaged the theatre and achieved considerable public success. At first, the Grec was the only venue used for festival productions, but today, the festival utilizes several venues throughout the city of Barcelona.

The festival pursues a two-fold mission: to stage the most outstanding works by Catalan artists and companies and to present other interesting shows from Spain and the rest of the world. 

Artists who have appeared at the Festival include Dario Fo, Lindsay Kemp, the Martha Graham Dance Company, Jan Fabre, Peter Brook, Sasha Waltz, Michel Piccoli, Robert Lepage,the Cloud Gate Dance Theater of Taiwan, Paco de Lucía, Cristina Hoyos, Carles Santos, Nacho Duato, Àlex Rigola, Calixto Bieito, Miles Davis, Manhattan Transfer, Joe Cocker, Celia Cruz, Chuck Berry, and Elvis Costello.

References

External links
 Grec Festival of Barcelona website

See also 

 Culture of Barcelona
 List of contemporary amphitheaters

1976 establishments in Spain
Recurring events established in 1976
Festivals in Spain
Culture in Barcelona
Tourist attractions in Barcelona
Buildings and structures completed in 1929
Theatres and concert halls in Barcelona
Theatres in Catalonia
Sants-Montjuïc
World's fair architecture in Barcelona
1929 Barcelona International Exposition
Amphitheatres in Spain